Dzyan was a German jazz-rock band. The band in its final form comprised Eddy Marron (guitar) Reinhard Karwatky (bass), and percussionist Peter Giger.

Discography 
 Dzyan 1972
 Time Machine 1973
 Electric Silence 1974
 Mandala (SWF-Session 1972) 2010

References

German jazz ensembles